Phenprobamate (Gamaquil, Isotonil) is a centrally acting skeletal muscle relaxant, with additional sedative and anticonvulsant effects. Overdose is similar to barbiturates. Its mechanism of action is probably similar to meprobamate. Phenprobamate has been used in humans as an anxiolytic, and is still sometimes used in general anesthesia and for treating muscle cramps and spasticity.  Phenprobamate is still used in some European countries, but it has generally been replaced by newer drugs. Phenprobamate is metabolized by oxidative degradation of the carbamate group and ortho-hydroxylation of the benzene ring, and is eliminated in urine by the kidneys.

Doses range from 400 to 800 mg, up to 3 times a day.

References

Further reading

External links 
 The Comparative Toxicogenomics Database: Phenprobamate
 Chembank: Phenprobamate

Muscle relaxants
Carbamates
GABAA receptor positive allosteric modulators